is a Japanese romantic comedy four-panel manga series by Nekoume. It has been serialized in Ichijinsha's seinen magazine Manga 4-Koma Palette from 2014 until 2022, after which it was moved to Monthly Comic Rex. There have been seven collected tankōbon volumes released as of October 2021. An audio drama based on the manga was released in 2016, and an anime television series adaptation by Silver Link aired in 2018. An English dub of the anime has been produced by Funimation.

The series follows Aki Shiina who, wanting to reaffirm his identity as man after being teased for his feminine looks, moves to the Sunohara-sou lodging house in Tokyo. He develops a crush on Sunohara-sou's proprietor Ayaka, who along with the other girls living there often tease him and make him dress like a woman. The series was well received by critics, who liked the characters and found the writing funny.

Plot
The series follows the shy Aki Shiina, whose feminine looks often cause him to be teased and mistaken for a girl. Wanting to reaffirm his identity as a man, he moves to the lodging house Sunohara-sou in Tokyo, and forms a crush on its motherly caretaker Ayaka Sunohara; his plan does not go smoothly, as Ayaka and the other residents – Yuzu Yukimoto, Sumire Yamanashi and Yuri Kazami of the Tanamachi student council – often tease him and make him wear women's clothes, while he keeps getting read as a girl.

Characters
 He is a shy boy who moves into Sunohara-sou and develops a crush on Ayaka.
 She is the motherly proprietor of Sunohara-sou, who treats Aki like a child.
 She is Ayaka's younger sister, and a gyaru.
 She is the student council president, and is an assertive girl who wears a plush chicklet-topped hair loop on her head out of insecurity over her height. She denies to have a crush on Shiina.
 She is the student council vice-president, a tall girl who has a crush on Yuzu, however she has a good siblinghood relationship with Shiina.
 She is the student council secretary and Yuzu's childhood friend, who wants to dress Aki in women's clothing because of his feminine looks.
 She is the proprietor of a liquor store, and a close friend of Ayaka.
 She is Aki's doting older sister, who treats him like a girl, making him cross-dress and calling him her "sister".
 She is one of Nana's schoolmates, and is a cheerful girl interested in younger men.
 She is one of Nana's schoolmates, and is described as a "perverted" girl interested in younger men.

Production and release
Miss Caretaker of Sunohara-sou is written and illustrated by Nekoume, and serialized as a four-panel manga by Ichijinsha in their seinen manga magazine Manga 4-Koma Palette since 2014; serialization ended in February 22, 2020, but was renewed on October 22 the same year. After the magazine ended in February 2022, Miss Caretaker of Sunohara-sou was moved to Ichijinsha's Monthly Comic Rex. The manga has been collected in seven tankōbon volumes in Japan, the second of which included an audio drama.

Volume list

Anime

An anime television series adaptation of the series was produced by Silver Link, and was directed by Mirai Minato, with Shin Oonuma as chief director, Fumihiko Shimo in charge of series composition, and Kazuya Hirata designing the characters. The music was composed by Ruka Kawada at FlyingDog.

The voice cast from the audio drama reprised their roles for the anime, on request from Nekoume. Owing to the limited number of characters, only a small number of people  were present during recording sessions, most of whom were women, leading to what Sato described as a cozy and friendly atmosphere. Sato aimed to make her portrayal of Ayaka come across as easy-going and gentle, while Kitamura aimed to portray Aki as innocent and pure, describing him as at times similar to "a small animal"; she thought that this was helped by how she is a woman, and that a male actor would have resulted in the character leaving a different impression.

The series aired from July 5 to September 20, 2018 on AT-X, Tokyo MX, and BS11, running for 12 episodes.

Promotion and release
The anime was announced in a promotional video for the third manga volume in November 2017, and an event was held to promote it in June 2018, prior to the series' premiere, where the show received blessings at the Kanda Shrine in Tokyo; a theme café was also held from June to July. A life-size figure of Ayaka was additionally created to promote the show; the design was chosen through a Twitter poll for fans of the series, between two drawings by Nekoume, and the figure was shown off for the first time at the Kanda Shrine event. The figure was later put up for sale for 1.99 million yen.

The series was released across four DVD and Blu-ray volumes in Japan from September 28 to December 21, 2018, with three episodes per volume; limited editions were also be released, which included acrylic figures of characters from the series. The ending theme was released on a single on August 1, 2018.

Funimation licensed the series, and released it with an English dub weekly through their website starting from July 25, 2019, followed by a North American Blu-ray release on November 10, 2020. Following Sony's acquisition of Crunchyroll, the series was moved to Crunchyroll. Animelab released the series digitally in Australia in January 2020, and released it on Blu-ray in the region on January 13, 2021.

Episode list

Reception
The first two volumes of the series were both among the best selling comics in Japan during their respective debut weeks, and by May 2018, over 350,000 copies of the manga had been sold. The anime did not have a big long-term effect on the manga sales.

Manga.Tokyo, Animate Times and Honey's Anime found the characters in the series cute, and thought it was cute to see Aki dressing like a girl. Honey's Anime considered the series cute, funny, and sexy, with the concept of being emasculated by pretty women "the ideal life", and called it funny to see Aki's misunderstandings and his attempts to impress Ayaka while pretending he is not doing so. They thought the series was not particularly original, but still thought that it succeeded in portraying its character archetypes. They liked the dynamic between Aki and Ayaka, but were at the same time grateful that their relationship did not turn romantic considering how much older Ayaka is than Aki. They considered several of the characters a bit overbearing for being clingy and harassing, though, including Maiko and Mea, Nana, Matsuri, Sumire, and Ayaka, but still found them entertaining.

Notes

References

External links
 

Anime series based on manga
Cross-dressing in anime and manga
Crunchyroll anime
Ichijinsha manga
LGBT in anime and manga
Romantic comedy anime and manga
Seinen manga
Silver Link
Yonkoma